Wade Martin Handley (born October 20, 1979) is a  DJ and record producer based in the United States.

Career 
Martin is the founder of JWMS, an umbrella corporation for JWM Records and WM Studios which he founded.
  He is also the co-owner of IME Records with Darryl "D.M.C." McDaniels (of Run–D.M.C.).

Martin has worked with artists/bands like Will.i.am, Icona Pop, Flavor Flav, Wyclef Jean, Katy Cappella, DMX (rapper), Nas, R. Kelly, Britney Spears, Millionaires (group), Carrot Top, and The Rolling Stones. He has also worked with record labels from Def Jam Recordings to Interscope Records and has guest judged on FOX's American Idol and The X Factor.

In August 2017, Krankz Audio brand signed a development agreement with Martin to collaborate on the development of the Krankz Studio/Wade Martin signature line of studio headphones.

Discography

Records

Singles and Albums

References 

Living people
1979 births
Record producers from California
Songwriters from California
American pop musicians